The Three Intermezzi for piano, Op. 117, are a set of three solo piano pieces composed by Johannes Brahms in 1892. The intermezzi were described by the critic Eduard Hanslick as "monologues"... pieces of a "thoroughly personal and subjective character" striking a "pensive, graceful, dreamy, resigned, and elegiac note."

The first intermezzo, in E major, is prefaced in the score by two lines from an old Scottish ballad, Lady Anne Bothwell's Lament: Balow, my babe, lie still and sleep! It grieves me sore to see thee weep. The middle section of the second intermezzo, in E minor, seems to Brahms’ biographer Walter Niemann to portray a "man as he stands with the bleak, gusty autumn wind eddying round him."

History 
Brahms composed the three Intermezzi of Opus 117 in the summer of 1892 while staying in Bad Ischl. In June of that year he asked his friend, the musicologist Eusebius Mandyczewski, to send him manuscript paper so that Brahms could "properly sketch" the three pieces. In September 1892 Clara Schumann learned of the existence of the pieces from her student Ilona Eibenschütz and wrote to Brahms requesting he send them to her. He obliged her request, sending her the completed pieces on 14 October 1892.

References

 Walter Gieseking. Schumann Brahms. Columbia Masterworks (ML 4540), 1952.

External links
 
 Detailed Listening Guide using the recording by Martin Jones

Piano pieces by Johannes Brahms
Compositions for solo piano
1892 compositions